Boreaphaenops is a genus of beetles in the family Carabidae, containing the following species:

 Boreaphaenops angustus Ueno, 2002
 Boreaphaenops hirundinis Ueno, 2005

References

Trechinae